Bangladesh Rice Research Institute is an agricultural research institute in Bangladesh, located in Gazipur. Mr. Md. Shahjahan Kabir is the current head of this institution. It is an autonomous institution run under The ministry of Agriculture, Bangladesh. It specializes in the research of rice production.

History 
Bangladesh Rice Research Institute was established on October 1, 1970. As of June 2019, the institute had developed 41 varieties of Aman rice.

References

External links 
Official webpage
 

Rice research institutes
Agricultural organisations based in Bangladesh
Recipients of the Independence Day Award
Organisations based in Gazipur
1970 establishments in East Pakistan
Agriculture research institutes in Bangladesh